Paul Atkinson (c. 1655 – 15 October 1729), born Matthew Atkinson, was an English Roman Catholic priest of the 17th and 18th Centuries, which were the penal times in the English Church. He is viewed as a martyr, dying in prison for his Catholic activities.

Life
He was born in Yorkshire.  He joined the English Franciscan institution, Douai Abbey in 1673, and then became a Catholic missionary in England for twelve years, after this he was betrayed by a maidservant for a £100 reward.

On 26 September 1700 he was convicted and condemned to perpetual imprisonment due to his status as a Catholic priest.  One governor of his prison, Hurst Castle on the Solent, allowed him to walk outside of the prison; but complaint was made of this and the leave was revoked. He died in prison in 1729 after nearly thirty years. He was buried in Winchester's Roman Catholic Cemetery.

References

Attribution

1655 births
1729 deaths
17th-century English Roman Catholic priests
18th-century English Roman Catholic priests